The 1949 World Federalist California Resolution was a measure passed by the California legislature that called on the United States Congress to amend the United States Constitution to allow for U.S. participation in a federal world government. It was introduced at the request of United World Federalists leaders Alan Cranston and Bob Walker.

References
s:1949 World Federalist California Resolution

World Federalist California Resolution
California law
World Federalist California Resolution
1949 in California
1949 in American law
1949 documents